is an email feature available on Japanese mobile phone services that allows users to use an online rich-text editor so that they can include decorative images (such as emoji), animations, and backgrounds in their email messages, which are encoded as HTML emails.

History
NTT Docomo first introduced Deco Mail as a feature to send emails on mobile phones with an online rich-text editor, which allowed users to customize and add decorative images, emojis, and backgrounds to their emails. The emails are encoded in and sent as HTML emails.  emoji are often used simply as an image or as a replacement for words.  emoji are 20 × 20 pixels in size. The emoji can be customized and downloaded from other websites.

The feature was later adopted by other Japanese mobile phone services under different brand names, such as Decoration Mail (Au), Decore Mail (SoftBank), and Decorative Mail (Willcom).

In a 2010 study, 4.3% of all emails sent by women consisted of  emoji, while men used it in 2.0% of their emails. In 2012, social media and messaging apps became popular with  users, particularly Line, which allow users to use stickers and emoji. Since then,  has largely declined from the widespread adoption of smartphones and messaging apps.

References

External links

Japanese popular culture
Japanese writing system
Mobile phone culture
NTT Docomo
Wasei-eigo